The Duke of Edinburgh's Award (commonly abbreviated DofE) is a youth awards programme founded in the United Kingdom in 1956 by Prince Philip, Duke of Edinburgh, that has since expanded to 144 nations. The awards recognise adolescents and young adults for completing a series of self-improvement exercises modelled on Kurt Hahn's solutions to his "Six Declines of Modern Youth".

In the United Kingdom, the programme is run by The Duke of Edinburgh's Award, a royal charter corporation. A separate entity, The Duke of Edinburgh's International Award Foundation, promotes the award abroad and acts as a coordinating body for award sponsors in other nations, which are organised into 62 National Award Authorities and a number of Independent Operators. Award sponsors in countries outside the United Kingdom may title their awards Duke of Edinburgh's Awards, though the recognition also operates under a variety of other names in countries without a historic link to the British monarchy, or that have severed such links.

History
In February 1956, The Duke of Edinburgh's Award was first announced. It was at first "for boys" aged 15 to 18. It was first administered, and largely designed, by John Hunt, who had led the first successful ascent of Mount Everest in 1953, and had retired from the army to run The Duke of Edinburgh's Award. It was designed to attract boys who had not been interested in joining one of the main British youth movements, such as the Scout Association. It was not necessary to 'join' any organisation, or wear a uniform to participate. In the first 12 months, 7,000 boys had enrolled for the scheme. The programme borrowed from the Moray Badge, instituted at Gordonstoun School by its headmaster, Kurt Hahn, in 1936, and the County Badge adopted in Moray in 1941.

In November 1957 it was announced that girls would be invited to participate. On 19 June 1958 the Award was extended to girls, with the first girls allowed to join from 1 September 1958. The programme for girls was not the same as that for boys, and was for ages 14 to 20. The first girls received their Gold Awards on 3 November 1959 at Buckingham Palace. From January 1965, the Gold Award for boys and girls was made more similar.

The first Gold Awards were achieved in 1958, and the charity was established in 1959. A single programme for young people aged 14 to 21 was launched in 1969, and extended to those up to 25 years of age in 1980.

In 2013, the Duke presented Awards at St James's Palace which included his 500th Gold Award Presentation.

United Kingdom

The first Duke of Edinburgh's Award ceremony was held in the United Kingdom in 1956.

Participation in DofE programmes and the number of awards achieved has grown every year since 1956. As of 2017, roughly 420,000 young people were taking part in Duke of Edinburgh's Award programmes run in nearly 11,000 designated DofE centres – including schools, youth clubs, Air cadets, Army Cadets and businesses – throughout the UK. Over 6 million young people in the UK have taken part in the DofE in the UK since 1956 (8 million worldwide). The Duke of Edinburgh's Award is a member of the National Council for Voluntary Youth Services (NCVYS).

In 2009, the old system of keeping track of progress through paper Record Books was replaced by the introduction of a major new  online system – eDofE. Participants use this system to track their progress, while Leaders use it to oversee participants' progress.

Award programmes
The Duke of Edinburgh's Award programmes take between one and four years to complete, and they must be completed by the participant's twenty-fifth birthday. There are around 300,000 new participants annually, with an estimated 461,000 current participants in the UK. The programmes are at three progressive levels which, if successfully completed, lead to a Bronze, Silver, or Gold Duke of Edinburgh's Award.

With assistance from adult Leaders, participants select and set objectives in each of the following areas:
Volunteering: undertaking service to individuals or the community.
Physical: improving in an area of sport, dance or fitness activities.
Skills: developing practical and social skills and personal interests.
Expedition: planning, training for, and completion of an adventurous journey in the UK or abroad. 
At Gold level, participants must do an additional fifth Residential section, which involves staying and working away from home for five days, doing a shared activity.

To achieve an award, the participant must work on each section for a minimum period of time, and must be monitored and assessed by someone with knowledge of the chosen activities. Each progressive level demands more time and commitment from participants: Bronze 3–6 months; Silver: 6–9 months; Gold: 12–18 months. Participants are required to show regular activity and commitment to the award for the duration of their DofE programme, which is usually at least one hour per week.

Joint Award Initiative
In Northern Ireland participants completing The Duke of Edinburgh's Award can choose to accept a certificate from the Gaisce or an International Award Certificate instead of a Duke of Edinburgh certificate.

Other nations
Awards modelled on The Duke of Edinburgh's Award are presented by sponsoring organisations affiliated with the Duke of Edinburgh's International Award Association in 144 nations: 29 located in the Americas; 36 in Africa; 32 in Asian Pacific countries; and 47 in Europe, around the Mediterranean, and in Arab countries. The prestige, scope and awareness of these awards vary from country to country and often – unlike awards programmes in Ireland and the United Kingdom – there is no connection to the head of state and awards are simply issued by private youth charities. In the United States, for instance, only about 7,000 of the estimated 47 million eligible persons age 14 to 24 annually participate in the programme.

Australia
The Award was established in Australia in 1959 on the initiative of Sir Adrien Curlewis (son of Herbert Curlewis) in 1958. By 1962 the award was available in all state and territories and today over 30,000 young Australians commence a Bronze, Silver or Gold Award each year. The Duke of Ed in Australia is a widely recognised organising and accrediting framework of non-formal education and learning.

Over 775,000 young Australians have now completed their award and approximately 45,000 are actively participating in the award program each year, supported by a network of 60,000 volunteers acting as award leaders, supervisors and assessors.

The Duke of Edinburgh's International Award can be found in over 1,200 locations and institutions across Australia including cities, rural and remote areas, through Government and independent schools, universities, indigenous communities, refugee support programmes, detention centres, community organisations, disability groups and other youth programs.

The National Chairman is currently Gary Nairn, and the National CEO is Peter Kaye. The Hon Larry Anthony is the chair of The Friends of The Duke of Edinburgh's Award in Australia and Andrew Murray AM is the Deputy Chair.

Bangladesh
In Bangladesh, the award is offered through "The Duke of Edinburgh’s International Award Foundation Bangladesh" organization, based in Dhaka since 2008. Various schools and universities participate.

Canada

The first Duke of Edinburgh's Award ceremony in Canada was held in 1964. By 2011, approximately 500,000 Canadians had received the award over the programme's 57-year history. In 2013, the Royal Bank of Canada announced a $1 million grant to help fund marketing and publicity efforts to increase awareness for the programme.

Cyprus
Participation in the Award has been available for many years.

Eswatini
"The Prince Makhosini Award" had 3,000 young people participating in the programme in Eswatini (formerly Swaziland) as of 2013.

Ghana
The scheme in Ghana is named the Head of State Award. It began in 1967, and by 2021 about 750,000 young people had taken part.

Hong Kong

India
India awards the "International Award for Young People" to youth who complete a self-improvement programme based on the Duke of Edinburgh's award model. The programme was first introduced to India in 1962 and was originally operated by the Indian Public Schools Conference. In 1989 the Award Programme Foundation, a registered charity, was established to oversee management of the award. According to the Award Programme Foundation, implementation of awards are undertaken by 154 local institutions, including governments, NGOs and universities. Despite the long history of the programme in India, only about 19,000 youth annually participate. As in many other nations, awards in India are granted in three levels – gold, silver and bronze – based on the complexity and time commitment of the projects undertaken by the individual award participant.

Ireland

"Gaisce – The President's Award" was established by a trust deed under the patronage of the President of Ireland on 28 March 1985. It joined the Duke of Edinburgh's International Awards Association in 1988. There are three awards: bronze, silver and gold. The profile of the award was raised substantially during the term of Mary Robinson.

Korea
The award was established in Korea in 2008 by Korea Youth Services Centre. The award is currently supported under The Ministry of Gender Equality and Family, which is an organisation organised by the government. The applicants have to be in an age in between 14 and 25 years old. Anyone who is over 14 but under 25 can challenge for the bronze award, but the applicants have to be at least 15 years old to start the silver medal, as well as the gold medal starts from 16 years old. Despite the fact that there have been fewer than ten gold medal winners in eight years, there has been an exponential increase of the number of applicants in Korea. It reached its peak in 2011, which recorded 3,500 applicants and there are over 6,000 young people, who have completed their awards by 2015. Also, there are 17 organisations or associations that are supporting the award.

Lesotho
"The Prince Mohato Award" was established in 1976. Its current patron is King Letsie III. As with other nations, the award is presented in three levels and eligible youth are those age 14 to 25. The chairperson of the awards program is Maureen Nyathi.

Malaysia
In Malaysia, the award is referred to as " Anugerah Remaja Perdana, RAKAN MUDA". It is a Full Member of The Duke of Edinburgh's International Association and was officially launched in Malaysia on 6 Nov 2000. The gold award will be awarded by the Malaysian Minister of Youth and Sport at an award ceremony.

New Zealand

In New Zealand, although one or two organisations started taking part earlier, it was not until 18 July 1963 that the Governor-General, Sir Bernard Fergusson, held the inaugural meeting of the National Council of The Duke of Edinburgh's Award in New Zealand at Government House in Wellington, when a Constitution for The Award in New Zealand was adopted.

In New Zealand the Award is referred to as the Duke of Edinburgh's Hillary Award.  The name draws on one of New Zealand's greatest adventurers, Sir Edmund Hillary. The Award has also previously been called in ‘The Young New Zealanders Challenge of the Duke of Edinburgh’s Hillary Award’. In 2015 there were 9,000 registrations annually and approximately 18,500 young people engaged at any one time in the Award in New Zealand.

Netherlands 
The Award was founded in the Netherlands in 1997 by Wim van der Laan and Maurice Jurgens. Known as "The International Award for Young People", it was officially recognised by the ministry of education in 2007 as a substitute for community service in secondary education and is currently being offered by 28 institutions.

Portugal 
The "Prémio Infante D. Henrique" is the Portuguese version of the Duke of Edinburgh's Award targeting those between 14 and 24 years old. It was established in 1988 in Porto by The Duke of Braganza, who remains its honorary president. The Prémio Infante D. Henrique consists of a program of personal and social development of voluntary and non-competitive activities in four areas:

 Community service
 Personal talents
 Sports
 Expedition
 Residential project - only for those who are older than 16 years old.

In 2015 the Prémio Infante D. Henrique became a licensee of the Duke of Edinburgh's Award and adopted the international brand.

Romania 
The Award was first introduced in 1991 by Sister Agnes in the Roman Catholic Parish of Motru, being carried on locally until 2011. Since 2011, the programme has expanded nationwide, where it was successfully implemented in several cities of Romania.

In April 2013 the license for Award Romania was signed in the presence of Secretary-General John May, and it became a National Award Authority.

Starting June 2013 The Duke of Edinburgh's International Award has Her Majesty Margareta, Custodian of the Romanian Crown, as Patron in Romania. Since then, the Award has seen a rapid expansion, engaging over 10,000 young people and over 2,000 Award Leaders and adult volunteers, with millions having participated around the world, finding their purpose, passion and place in the world.

Singapore
In Singapore, the award is referred to as "National Youth Achievement Award". It is a full member of The Duke of Edinburgh's International Association and was officially launched in Singapore on 9 May 1992 by president Wee Kim Wee at the Istana.

South Africa
In South Africa, the Award is referred to as the President's Award for Youth Empowerment. The Award was first established in 1983 under the name The Gold Shield Award, but in 1992, in anticipation of Nelson Mandela becoming the first president of a democratic South Africa, the name was changed to The President's Award for Youth Empowerment.

In its 33-year history of youth engagement in South Africa, the Award Programme has reached over 150,000 young people in the country. The President's Award has a full licence to operate the Award in South Africa, from the Duke of Edinburgh's International Award Foundation, which oversees Award Programmes in over 140 countries globally, with 25 of these being in Africa.

There are over 14,300 active participants in South Africa (2014) and the Award Programme is currently being used by over 250 Award Units nationally (community youth groups, residential youth facilities, schools and correctional centres) as a workable framework for youth empowerment.  It is being increasingly sought to provide a framework for youth-at-risk, providing them with a positive, affirming alternative to the social challenges which they face within their communities.  The Award Programme is not a once off intervention but is a longer-term process, taking between three and five years to complete all three levels of Bronze, Silver, and Gold.

United States
In the U.S., the award is offered through "The Duke of Edinburgh’s International Award USA" organization, based in Chicago. Various schools and some Scout councils participate.

Zambia
"The Duke of Edinburgh International Award", "The International Youth Award", or simply "The International Award" was founded in Zambia in 1989. Although the concept of the Duke of Edinburgh's Award was introduced to Zambia in September 1981, it was only in 1989 when the Zambian government decided to integrate it into the President's Youth Award of Zambia in existence at the time. In 1990, a National Youth Award Committee was elected and operated under the National Youth Development Council (NYDC). In May 1991, a pilot project started with 50 young individuals and by December the same year 30 had qualified for the Bronze Award level. At the 4th forum, held in November 1991 in Hong Kong, Zambia was given a provisional membership of the International Award Association.

In 1992, the National Youth Award Committee decided to change the name of the programme in Zambia from President's Youth Award to National Youth Award Association to avoid possible political misunderstanding. In the mid-1990s, the Award got a new lease of life when private schools began to adopt the Award, reporting directly to the International Secretariat in London in the absence of a National Award Authority. At this point, slight name variations arose in different private schools depending on organisers; however, the integrity of the award is still maintained.

See also
 Outward Bound
 Hong Kong Award for Young People, known formerly as Duke of Edinburgh's Award
 The President's Challenge

References

External links

Official site
eDofE Page
Information on the International Award Programme in Australia
Information on the International Award Programme in Canada
Information on the International Award Programme in New Zealand
Official Expedition Kit List United Kingdom
Information on the DofE in Edinburgh
Information on the  International Award Programme in Singapore
Information on the DofE in Croydon
Information on the  International Award Programme in Netherlands
Gaisce – The President's Award
USA Duke of Edinburgh's Award

British awards
British Royal Family charities
Awards by age of recipient
Prince Philip, Duke of Edinburgh
Organisations based in Berkshire
Windsor, Berkshire
Awards established in 1956
1956 establishments in the United Kingdom